Aeroclub Barcelona-Sabadell is a major aeroclub founded in 1953, as a result of the union of two aviation clubs in Catalonia, Barcelona and Sabadell. The AeroClub Barcelona Sabadell carries out its activities at the Sabadell Airport (Barcelona) at the La Cerdaña Aerodrome (Gerona) and at the Seo de Urgell Airport (Lleida). Although it is at the Sabadell Airport where its headquarters are located, and where most of the activity of powered flight takes place.

Fleet
AeroClub Barcelona-Sabadell fleet is made up of a total of 43 aircraft: 27 single-engine aircraft, 4 multi-engine aircraft, 3 helicopters, 3 aerobatic aircraft and 6 gliders.

See also 
Aero Club Milano
Letalski center Maribor
Flying club

External links
Aeroclub Barcelona-Sabadell web page
Facebook

References

Flying clubs
Organizations established in 1953
Civil aviation in Spain
Flight training
Aviation schools
Aircraft maintenance
Organisations based in Barcelona
1953 establishments in Catalonia